Rosières-en-Santerre (literally Rosières in Santerre) is a commune in the Somme department in Hauts-de-France in northern France.

Geography
Rosières station has rail connections to Amiens and Laon.

Population

Places of interest

 The mairie
 The church

Twin towns
 Drochtersen, Germany since 1972

See also
Communes of the Somme department

References

External links

 Rosières-en-Santerre – Official website 

Communes of Somme (department)